The Movement for the Development of Mayotte (formerly the Mahoran Departmentalist Movement) is a political party in the French overseas department of Mayotte. In the elections in Mayotte of March 21 and 28, 2004 for the General Council of Mayotte the party won 23.3% of the popular vote and 6 out of 19 seats.

See also
:Category:Movement for the Development of Mayotte politicians

References

Political parties in Mayotte